Pind Matay Khan is a village and union council of Jhelum District in the Punjab province of Pakistan. It is part of Sohawa Tehsil,.

References 

Populated places in Tehsil Sohawa
Union councils of Sohawa Tehsil